Chobot  is a settlement in the administrative district of Gmina Bolesławiec, within Wieruszów County, Łódź Voivodeship, in central Poland.

References

Villages in Wieruszów County